Thomas Heppell Varty (2 December 1921 – April 2004) was an English footballer who scored 38 goals from 196 appearances in the Football League playing as an inside forward or wing half for Darlington and Watford in the years following the Second World War.

Varty was born in Newcastle upon Tyne, and began his football career with his hometown club, Newcastle United, as an amateur just before the Second World War. He moved on to Darlington during the war, and turned professional with that club in 1945. In 1946, he scored once as the Football Association's representative team beat a Universities Athletic Union XI by ten goals to one. Varty was a regular in Darlington's first team in the Third Division North, missing only six games over four seasons. He then spent the 1950–51 Football League season with Third Division South club Watford, which took his total league appearances to 196, before returning to his native north-east of England to pursue business interests.

References

1921 births
2004 deaths
Footballers from Newcastle upon Tyne
English footballers
Association football forwards
Newcastle United F.C. players
Darlington F.C. players
Watford F.C. players
English Football League players